Borrell is a common surname in modern Catalan language, and was also a given name in the past. It can refer to:

Alfons Borrell i Palazón (born 1931), Catalan painter
Andrea Borrell (born 1963), Cuban basketball player
 Borrell of Ausona (died 820), first count of Cerdanya
 Borrell II of Barcelona (died 992), Count of Barcelona
 Borrell I of Pallars (died 995), Count of Pallars
 Borrell (died 1018), bishop of Vic
 Dick Borrell (born 1951), American politician, businessman, and educator
 Emily Borrell (born 1992), Cuban volleyball player
 Federico Borrell García (died 1936), Spanish Republican soldier of the Spanish Civil War
 Francisco Mora y Borrell, 19th century Catalan-American priest
 Henry Perigal Borrell (1795-1851), British numismatist.
 Johnny Borrell (born 1980), British musician
 Josep Borrell (born 1947), Spanish politician, High Representative of the European Union since 2019.
 Lazaro Borrell (born 1972), Cuban athlete
 Pedro Borrell (born 1944), Dominican architect and archeologist
 Pere Borrell del Caso (1835-1910), Catalan painter
 Ramon Borrell, Count of Barcelona, count of Barcelona, Girona, and Ausona from 992.
 Teresa Borrell (born 1962), New Zealand sports shooter

See also
 Borel (disambiguation)
 Borrel

Catalan-language surnames